The National Badema is the name of an orchestra formed in 1976 by former members of "les Maravillas du Mali”.  From the lush savanna in the south to the all-encompassing desert of the north, the Badema National's repertoire spans the diversity of Malian music. The orchestra's purpose is the revitalization of Malian musical heritage by the training, the supervision, and the production of albums for needy, up-and-coming musicians.

Tours 
Foire Internationale of Dakar, Senegal
Festival Panafricain de la Jeunesse of Tripoli, Libya
Artistic Tour in Côte d'Ivoire
10th Festival of Guinea Conakry

Instruments 
The Badema employs traditional Malian instruments within the modern context.  Even though its base lies with traditional rock instruments such as keyboards, guitars, and drums, the following instruments are employed by the Badema:
Djembé
Kamalen N’Goni
Tamani (Talking drum)
Soku (One-stringed violin)
Balafon

Discography
National Badema du Mali 2004 
Original Kasse Mady 1999 Sono CDS 7071 CD reissue 
Nama 1983 Syllart 38767-1 LP, initially released on Mali Kunkan / Ivoire Polydisc IP 8300 
Tira Makan 1977 on Mali Kunkan (ref.KO 77.07.07)

References

Malian musical groups
Traditional musical groups